Gennaro Iezzo (born 8 June 1973) is an Italian former football goalkeeper.

Club career
Iezzo began his career at hometown club Juve Stabia before moving on to play for Scafatese, Avellino, Nocerina, Verona, Calcio Catania and Cagliari. He spent two seasons as the partenopei's number one in Serie C1 and Serie B, helping Napoli earn promotion back into Serie A, also briefly serving as the club's captain.

Managerial career
In 2012, Iezzo resigned as coach of Serie D club Sant'Antonio Abate after getting three consecutive defeats in first three games.

In April 2022, Iezzo returned into management as the new head coach of POFC Botev Vratsa in the Bulgarian First League. In his five games in charge of the club, he achieved two wins, two draws and a defeat, and saved the team from relegation after leading them to defeat Etar Veliko Tarnovo 3–2 in a promotion/relegation playoff.

References

1973 births
Living people
Italian footballers
S.S. Scafatese Calcio 1922 players
S.S. Juve Stabia players
U.S. Avellino 1912 players
A.S.G. Nocerina players
Cagliari Calcio players
Catania S.S.D. players
S.S.C. Napoli players
Hellas Verona F.C. players
Serie A players
Serie B players
Association football goalkeepers
Sportspeople from the Province of Naples
Footballers from Campania